Hamza Tariq (born July 21, 1990) is a Canadian cricketer. He plays as wicket-keeper batsman for the Canada national cricket team and made his debut in 2011. He has also played franchise cricket in the Caribbean Premier League and Global T20 Canada.

Personal life
Tariq was born in Karachi, Pakistan. His family immigrated to Canada when he was 12 years old. He began playing cricket in Calgary, Alberta, at the age of 15. As of 2016 he was an accounting student at the Southern Alberta Institute of Technology.

International career
Tariq played two games for the Canada Under-19s at the 2010 Under-19 Cricket World Cup in New Zealand.

Tariq was part of Canada's squad for the 2011 Cricket World Cup in India, but did not play any games at the tournament. During the tournament, he was the target of a corrupt approach, which he reported to the ICC Anti-Corruption Unit.

In January 2018, he was named in Canada's squad for the 2018 ICC World Cricket League Division Two tournament.

In September 2018, he was named in Canada's squad for the 2018–19 ICC World Twenty20 Americas Qualifier tournament. 

In August 2019, he was named in Canada's squad for the Regional Finals of the 2018–19 ICC T20 World Cup Americas Qualifier tournament. In September 2019, he was named in Canada's squad for the 2019 Malaysia Cricket World Cup Challenge League A tournament. In October 2019, he was named in Canada's squad for the 2019 ICC T20 World Cup Qualifier tournament in the United Arab Emirates.

In October 2021, he was named in Canada's squad for the 2021 ICC Men's T20 World Cup Americas Qualifier tournament in Antigua. In February 2022, he was named in Canada's squad for the 2022 ICC Men's T20 World Cup Global Qualifier A tournament in Oman.

Franchise career
Tariq was drafted by the Trinbago Knight Riders for the 2016 Caribbean Premier League. He scored a "crucial" 18 runs in the team's victory over St Kitts and Nevis Patriots in the final of the 2017 Caribbean Premier League.

On 3 June 2018, he was selected to play for the Winnipeg Hawks in the players' draft for the inaugural edition of the Global T20 Canada tournament. In June 2019, he was selected to play for the Winnipeg Hawks franchise team in the 2019 Global T20 Canada tournament.

References

External links
Hamza Tariq at ESPNCricinfo

1990 births
Canadian cricketers
Canada One Day International cricketers
Canada Twenty20 International cricketers
Hamza
Hamza
Living people
Hamza
Hamza
Trinbago Knight Riders cricketers
ICC Americas cricketers
Wicket-keepers